Carl Johnson may refer to:

 Carl Johnson (American football) (born 1949), American football player
 Carl Johnson (soccer) (1892–1970), American soccer player
 Carl Johnson (athlete) (1898–1932), American track-and-field athlete
 Carl C. Johnson, African American aviator.
 Carl J. Johnson (1929–1988), American public health physician who opposed nuclear testing
 Carl L. Johnson (1898-1958), American businessman and politician
 Carl M. Johnson (born 1933), American businessman, farmer, and politician
 Carl H. Johnson, American-born biologist
 Carl Johnson (Grand Theft Auto), video game character and protagonist of Grand Theft Auto: San Andreas

See also
Karl Johnson (disambiguation)
Carl Jonsson (1885–1966), Swedish tug-of-war competitor